Nikolskaya is a rural locality (a village) in Verkhovskoye Rural Settlement, Verkhovazhsky District, Vologda Oblast, Russia. The population was 16 as of 2002.

Geography 
Nikolskaya is located 53 km southwest of Verkhovazhye (the district's administrative centre) by road. Borovskaya is the nearest rural locality.

References 

Rural localities in Verkhovazhsky District